Nosal (lit. 'The Nose') is a mountain in the Tatra Mountains of Poland, and is 1,206 metres AMSL at its highest. It is a popular tourist destination located near the Polish town of Zakopane, particularly for skiing and gliding.

References

External links

Mountains of Poland
Mountains of the Western Carpathians
Western Tatras